You Are Everything may refer to:
 "You Are Everything", a single by The Stylistics
 "You Are Everything, a single by Dru Hill
 "You Are Everything", a single by Matthew West
 You Are Everything, an album by David Hasselhoff

See also 
 You're Everything (disambiguation)